XPM may refer to:

 Primecoin, a peer-to-peer open source cryptocurrency
 X PixMap, an ASCII text image format used by the X Window System (uses the extension .xpm)
 XPM (TV series), a Canadian sitcom television series
 Extreme project management
 Cross-phase modulation, a technique used in optical transmission and reception
 Windows XP Mode, a virtualization feature available for Windows 7